Tamanna is a 1997 Indian Hindi-language drama film directed by Mahesh Bhatt. It stars Paresh Rawal, Pooja Bhatt, Sharad Kapoor and Manoj Bajpayee. The screenplay was written by Tanuja Chandra. The story was written by Tanuja Chandra and Mahesh Bhatt. It was produced by Pooja Bhatt.

Plot
The year is 1975, the place is Mahim, Bombay. This is the story of Tikku (Paresh Rawal), a transgender and the only child of yesteryear Bollywood actress Nazneen Begum. Begum has fallen upon hard times, is virtually destitute, and is dependent on Tikku, who does make-up/hair-dressing of Bollywood actresses. When she passes away, Tikku is beside himself with grief. After the funeral, he witnesses a woman leaving a child in a garbage bin. Tikku picks up the girl, longing for human company, decides to keep her, names her Tamanna, and brings her up on his own with the help of a close friend, Saleem (Manoj Bajpayee).

When she is old enough, he arranges for her education in St. Mary's High School's hostel. When she completes school, she returns home to find Tikku in the guise of a hijra and shuns him, but subsequently relents. Then Tikku finds out that Tamanna (Pooja Bhatt) is the daughter of Ranvir Chopra, an up-and-coming politician. He tells her, and she goes to their palatial house. Watch what impact this has on the Chopra family and the excuse they have for abandoning Tamanna.

Cast
 Paresh Rawal as Tikku
 Pooja Bhatt as Tamanna Chopra
 Sharad Kapoor as Sajid Khan
 Manoj Bajpayee as Saleem Khan
 Kamal Chopra as Ranveer Chopra, Tamanna's biological father
 Abha Ranjan as Geeta Chopra, Tamanna's biological mother
 Ashutosh Rana as a contract killer
 Akshay Anand as Jugal Chopra, Tamanna's brother
 Nadira as Nazneen Begum, Tikku's mother
 Zohra Sehgal as Ranveer Chopra's mother
 Sulabha Deshpande as Kaushalya, servant of the Chopra family
 Anupam Shyam as Anjum, Tikku's step-brother
 Rita Bhaduri as Mother Superior (cameo)
 Kunika as a movie actress, Tikku's client (cameo)
 Baby Ghazal as a Young Tamanna Chopra
 Alia Bhatt as Baby Tamanna Chopra
 Kunal Khemu as young Sajid
 Shaheen Bhatt as Ashutosh Rana's daughter

Reception
Paresh Rawal was critically praised for his role as a eunuch.

Awards
This film won National Film Award for Best Film on Other Social Issues in 1998.

Soundtrack
The music is composed by Anu Malik with lyrics by Rahat Indori, Makhdoom MohiuddinNida Fazli, Indeevar and Kaifi Azmi. Kumar Sanu, Sonu Nigam and Alka Yagnik were selected to sing the tracks. Yeh Kya Hua became a very popular song in 1997.

References

External links
 

1997 films
1990s Hindi-language films
Indian LGBT-related films
Films directed by Mahesh Bhatt
Films scored by Anu Malik
Best Film on Other Social Issues National Film Award winners
1997 LGBT-related films